Sean Cunningham may refer to:
Seán Cunningham (1918–1997), Irish Republican and co-operative activist
Sean S. Cunningham (born 1941), American film director, producer, and writer
Sean Cunningham (RAF officer) (1976–2011), Red Arrows pilot who died when his ejector seat deployed accidentally while his aircraft was still on the ground
Sean Cunningham (musician) (born 1985), American musician and singer-songwriter
Sean Cunningham (basketball) (born 1986), American-Dutch basketball player
Sean Cunningham (soccer) (born 1993), American soccer player